Euro-scene Leipzig is a contemporary European theatre and dance festival in Germany.

Theatre festivals in Germany
Events in Leipzig